Diego Jardel Koester (born 26 December 1989), known as Diego Jardel, is a Brazilian footballer who plays as an attacking midfielder for Brusque.

Playing career
After playing with Camboriú, Jardel joined Avaí in 2013. He played over 50 times for Avaí, including 45 times in the Campeonato Brasileiro Série B. Before the start of the 2015 season, Jardel negotiated a season-long loan with newly relegated Botafogo de Futebol e Regatas. Jardel has returned to Avaí after the end of loan term since 31 December 2015.

On 12 January 2022, he returned to Brazil and joined Brusque-SC.

References

External links

1989 births
Living people
Brazilian footballers
Association football midfielders
Campeonato Brasileiro Série B players
Qatar Stars League players
UAE Pro League players
Camboriú Futebol Clube players
Clube Náutico Marcílio Dias players
Avaí FC players
Botafogo de Futebol e Regatas players
F.C. Arouca players
U.D. Leiria players
Al-Arabi SC (Qatar) players
Al Dhafra FC players
Ajman Club players
Brusque Futebol Clube players
Brazilian expatriate footballers
Brazilian expatriate sportspeople in Portugal
Expatriate footballers in Portugal
Expatriate footballers in Qatar
Brazilian expatriate sportspeople in Qatar
Brazilian expatriate sportspeople in the United Arab Emirates
Expatriate footballers in the United Arab Emirates